Room 101 is a SBS One comedy television series hosted by Paul McDermott, based on the UK series of the same name, in which celebrities are invited to discuss their dislikes and pet hates. The series was scheduled to premiere on February 23, 2015 but the network decided to delay the launch until July 11, 2015.

The series name is inspired by Room 101, the torture room in George Orwell's 1949 novel Nineteen Eighty-Four which reputedly contained "the worst thing in the world". The series was filmed at the Special Broadcasting Service in the Sydney suburb of Artarmon.

Episodes
2015

References

External links
SBS website

Special Broadcasting Service original programming
2010s Australian comedy television series
2015 Australian television series debuts
2015 Australian television series endings
English-language television shows
Television series by Matchbox Pictures
Works based on Nineteen Eighty-Four
Australian television series based on British television series